Dmitri Fyodorovich Polyakov (6 July 1921 – 15 March 1988) was a Major General in the Soviet GRU during the Cold War, and a double agent who revealed Soviet secrets to the United States Federal Bureau of Investigation and later the Central Intelligence Agency. In the CIA, he was known by code names BOURBON and ROAM, while the FBI knew him as TOPHAT.

Early life
The son of a bookkeeper, Dmitri was born in Ukraine in 1921. He graduated from Sumy Artillery School in June 1941 and served as an artillery officer during World War II and was decorated for bravery.  After the war and his studies at the M. V. Frunze Military Academy and GRU Training Courses, he joined Soviet Military Intelligence, the GRU. His first mission was with the Soviet delegation to the Military Staff Committee of the United Nations in New York City from 1951–1956, directing a ring of Soviet spies.

GRU officer and double agent
On his second assignment to New York, United States in 1959–1961, he approached FBI counterintelligence agents to offer his services as an informant. His follow-up overseas assignments included Rangoon, Burma (1965–1969) and New Delhi, India (1973–1976 and 1979–1980) where he was posted as Soviet Military Attaché. Polyakov maintained that he was a Russian patriot, motivated to become a mole because he was disgusted with the corruption of the Soviet Communist Party elite. His CIA contact from New Delhi believed that his service on the front lines of World War II was a factor in his decision to become a double agent. Another CIA agent who handled his case for 15 years said that "He articulated a sense that he had to help us out or the Soviets were going to win the cold war, and he couldn't stand that. He felt we were very naive and we were going to fail." Victor Cherkashin suggested that he was embittered because Soviet leadership denied him permission to take his seriously ill son, the eldest of three, to a hospital in New York where he could get adequate medical attention for Polio. His son died as a result of the illness and soon after, Polyakov began his informant activities.

Soon after his initial contact with the FBI, he was posted back to Moscow where he was able to access GRU documents to identify double agents. He exposed Frank Bossard, a guided-missile researcher in the British aviation ministry and U.S. Army Sergeant Jack Dunlap, a courier at the National Security Agency as working for the Soviets. In the late 1960s while stationed in Rangoon, he gave the CIA all the intel the GRU had on both the Vietnamese and Chinese military. Around this time he also passed on information about the growing split between China and Russia at the time that would later be used by Henry Kissinger and Richard Nixon in their opening of relationships with China in 1972.

Arrest and execution
Polyakov was arrested by the KGB in 1986, six years after his retirement from the GRU. His contacts at the CIA had no information about what had happened to him. Only later did it become clear that he was betrayed by both Robert Hanssen and Aldrich Ames. In 1988, Polyakov was sentenced to death for treason, and subsequently executed.

Legacy
For 25 years, he remained a CIA informant as he rose through the ranks, eventually becoming a general. CIA officers speak in superlatives about the kind of information he provided. CIA officer Jeanne Vertefeuille said, "He didn't do this for money.  He insisted on staying in place to help us. It was a bad day for us when we lost him." Polyakov insisted on only being paid $3,000 a year and accepted this payment mostly in the form of power tools along with fishing and hunting equipment. Sandy Grimes said that Polakov was "the best source at least to my knowledge that American intelligence has ever had and I would submit, although I certainly can't be certain, but the best source that any intelligence service has ever had." She also noted that “This was a man of tremendous courage...In the end, we won. The Cold War is over and the Soviet Union was dissolved.” Former CIA director James Woolsey said "Polyakov was the jewel in the crown" and in a 2001 interview he told a reporter "What Gen. Polyakov did for the West didn't just help us win the Cold War...it kept the Cold War from becoming hot.” Some CIA and FBI officials, including Deputy Director William Sullivan, believed that, at some point, Polyakov was turned by the Soviets and made into a triple agent who deceived the West with disinformation.

Among the important information Polyakov provided:
 Evidence of the rift between the Soviet Union and China. This information played a crucial role in US President Richard Nixon's decision to open diplomatic relations with China in 1972.
 Technical data on Soviet-made antitank missiles.  While the US never fought the Soviet Union directly, knowledge of these weapons proved invaluable when Iraq employed them in the Gulf War.
 Proof that British Intelligence official Frank Bossard was a mole for the USSR.

References

1921 births
1988 deaths
GRU officers
Soviet major generals
Soviet military personnel of World War II
Soviet people executed for spying for the United States
Executed spies
People executed by the Soviet Union by firearm
Frunze Military Academy alumni
Russian spies
Executed Soviet people from Ukraine
Soviet military attachés